According to the Ukrainian census of 2001, the Belarusian language is native to 56,249 people in the country, including 19.8% of ethnic Belarusians. The largest number of Belarusian-speakers live in Dnipropetrovsk Oblast (6,239), Crimea (5,204) and Donetsk Oblast (4,842). The regions with the largest percentages of Belarusian speakers out of their total population are Crimea (0.26%), Chernihiv Oblast (0.19%) and Dnipropetrovsk Oblast (0.18%).

Overall 
In Ukraine overall, Belarusian speakers over time:

Among ethnic Belarusians 

According to censuses, the native languages of ethnic Belarusians in Ukraine were:

Among Belarusians of Ukraine, their fluency in the Belarusian language dropped from 48.5% to 31.7% from 1989 to 2001.

Significant Belarusian-speaking settlements 
This chart lists settlements in which at least 10% of the population spoke Belarusian as their mother tongue during the 2001 census. Italics indicate settlements with a population of less than 25 people.

References 

Ethnic groups in Ukraine
Languages of Ukraine
Belarusian people
Belarusian language